Lee Richardson (September 11, 1926 – October 2, 1999) was an American character actor who frequently appeared in the films of Sidney Lumet.

Richardson appeared in such films as Brubaker, Prince of the City, Prizzi's Honor, Tiger Warsaw, The Fly II, Q&A, The Exorcist III, Daniel and A Stranger Among Us and such television series as Law & Order and Hearts and Minds. He also narrated Network and appeared in the television film Skylark. He appeared in an uncredited role as Franklin D. Roosevelt in Truman.

Richardson died of cardiac arrest on October 2, 1999 in New York City, aged 73.

Filmography 
1959: Middle of the Night - Lockman's son
1976: Network - Narrator (voice)
1980: Brubaker - Warden Renfro
1981: Prince of the City - Sam Heinsdorff
1983: Daniel
1983: I Am the Cheese - Mr. Grey
1985: Prizzi's Honor - Dominic Prizzi
1987: Sweet Lorraine - Sam
1987: Amazing Grace and Chuck - Jeffries
1987: The Believers - Dennis Maslow
1988: Tiger Warsaw - Mitchell Warsaw
1989: The Fly II - Anton Bartok
1990: Q&A - Leo Bloomenfeld
1990: The Exorcist III - University President
1992: A Stranger Among Us - Rebbe

Theater 
 1960: Summer and Smoke by Tennessee Williams
 1962: The Merchant of Venice

References

External links

1926 births
1999 deaths
American male film actors
American male television actors
Male actors from Chicago
20th-century American male actors